Flavopunctelia flaventior is a species of foliose lichen in the family Parmeliaceae. It was first formally described as a new species by James Stirton in 1877 as Parmelia flaventior. In 1982, Hildur Krog transferred it to the subgenus Flavopunctelia of her newly circumscribed genus Punctelia, created to contain Parmelia species with punctate (point-like) pseudocyphellae. Mason Hale raised this subgenus to generic status a couple of years later, setting Flavopunctelia flaventior as the type species of the new genus. The lichen is commonly known as the speckled greenshield. Flavopunctelia flaventior occurs in Asia, Europe, East Africa, North America, and South America.

References

flaventior
Lichen species
Lichens described in 1877
Lichens of Africa
Lichens of Asia
Lichens of Europe
Lichens of North America
Lichens of South America
Taxa named by James Stirton